Bat-Sheva Zeisler is an Israeli vocalist, actress, and voice teacher. She sings in the soprano range.

Biography
Bat-Sheva Zeisler's father was the city architect of Rishon Lezion, where she still lives. Zeisler graduated from the Tel Aviv University, where she studied drama and literature. She then studied voice at London's Guildhall School of Music and Drama and the London College of Music.

She was married to Israeli artist Gideon Gechtman (1942–2008), whom she met in London. Their son, Noam, works in the advertising industry. Another son, Yotam, a film director, died in 1997.

Theater and acting career
Bat-Sheva Zeisler was a member of the original cast of You and Me and the Next War, a satirical cabaret by Hanoch Levin with songs set to music by Alex Kagan and Beni Nagari. An updated version was performed by the original cast from 2004 through 2008. The director of the play was Edna Shavit.

Other productions she participated in include Everything You Wanted to Know Often, and Didn't Dare to Ask Bach short one act plays by Offenbach, directed by Eran Baniel, with Dani Masseng co-acting, and stage choreography by the late Ya'akov Sommer and musical directing of Yitzhak Steiner; The Beggar's Opera at the Beersheba Theater, with new music by Alex Kagan and directed by Dan Ronnen; An Upside-Down Monument by Yossef Mundi, and directed by him at Yuval Theater; Intimacy directed by Tammar Lederer, at Hasimta Theater; My Fair Lady, The Imaginary Patient and The Star of Tears. The two latter were directed by Motti Averbuch. Star of Tears was written by him and put to music as an opera by Thierie Wieder.

Zeisler managed the Elharizi Theater in Tel Aviv.

Singing career
Zeisler has an extensive career as a soprano vocalist. Among her programs are Songs in Red and Yellow, Bat-Sheva and Simcha go to Broadway with Habimah singer-actor Simcha Barbiro and songs by Eric Satie and Francis Poulenc. In several of these programs she is accompanied by the Dutch-Israeli classical pianist Bart Berman. She works as a voice coach.

Discography
 Alan Jay Lerner and Frederick Loewe: My Fair Lady (Helicon, 1986)
 Hanoch Levin: You, Me and the Next War (Ofir, 2004)

References

External links
Batsheva Zeisler at Notes on Franz Schubert

Living people
Alumni of the Guildhall School of Music and Drama
20th-century Israeli women singers
Israeli musical theatre actresses
Israeli operatic sopranos
Israeli stage actresses
Tel Aviv University alumni
People from Rishon LeZion
Jewish opera singers
Year of birth missing (living people)